The karbovanets or karbovanet (plural: карбованці, karbovantsi for 2–4, or карбованців, karbovantsiv for 5 or more), also known as kupon (plural: купони, kupony) or coupon, has been a distinct unit of currency in Ukraine during three separate periods of the 20th century. It is also a predecessor currency of today's Ukrainian hryvnia.

The karbovanets was subdivided into one hundred kopiykas, but no denominations in kopiykas have ever been issued.

In the ISO 4217 standard, the official name is spelled as karbovanet, while English version of the National Bank of Ukraine's website refers to it as karbovanets.

History

First karbovanets (1917–1920)

Bank-notes of the Ukrainian People's Republic (17 March 1917 – 29 April 1918)
In March 1917 in Kyiv, some political parties formed the Central Rada which proclaimed on 20 November 1917, the foundation of the Ukrainian People's Republic.

And by just December 19 of the same year, a temporary law about the issue of state banknotes by the UPR was adopted. According to this law: "Banknotes must be issued in karbovanets". Each karbovanets contains 17.424 parts of pure gold and is divided into two hryvnias  or 200 shahs.

The etymology of the name "karbovanets" is debatable: by one supposition it originated in Ukraine from the ancient primitive way to carve (karbuvaty) numbers of calculations on a rod, and by another supposition – from the carving (incision) on a rim of a metal rouble.

On 5 January 1918, the first Ukrainian banknote with a value of 100 karbovanets was issued. There is an interesting detail: the trident depicted on the banknote was proclaimed as a National Emblem of the UPR only on 25 February 1918. On all issued banknotes was stated only one series – "AД" and only one number – 185. Combined with the use of ordinary paper (without watermarks) for printing of this banknote, this led to the appearance of a great number of counterfeit bank-notes in circulation.

On 20 September 1918, the Central Rada proclaimed the issue of banknotes of the State Treasure in denominations of 5, 10, 25, and 50 karbovanets, to be valid until 1 March 1924. On 6 April, the population of Kyiv first saw 25-karbovanets banknotes, and 50 karbovanets banknotes later appeared, but 5- and 10-karbovanets banknotes were not released. Primarily this series of banknotes was issued without designation of series and number. In subsequent issues, the series indicated the place of printing: AK (Kyiv) and AO (Odessa).

After the occupation of Odessa by military units of Denikin's Army in spring 1919, the printing house of Odessa continued printing bank-notes of 50 karbovanets. The Ukrainian Government was indignant and proclaimed money issued by the Denikinists to be false (series AO, numbers 210 and above).

In 1920, the Government of Ukraine printed some dozens of millions of banknotes for temporary use of Revolutionary Committee in the Western Ukraine. This issue of series AO had numbers from 236 to 250.

The next release by the Central Rada (Parliament of Ukraine) was issued on 19 April 1918 and included denominations of 10, 20, 30, 40 and 50 shahs. The term "shah" is borrowed by the Central Rada from the ancient name of small coins (change) from as long ago as the 16th century. Shahs were printed in Kyiv in sheets of 100, perforated in order to simplify tearing off separate banknotes. "Shahs" were in circulation until March 1919 when they were abolished by the Soviets. There are many existing banknotes of this value.

Bank-notes of the Ukrainian State Government (29 April 1918 – 14 November 1918)

The Congress of Free Hubb'andmen on 29 April 1918 (with the great support of Austrian-German occupants), elected tsarist general P.P. Skoropadsky as Hetman of Ukraine. He proclaimed the overthrow of the Central Rada Government and the foundation of the Ukrainian State.

In Skoropadsky's time, the so-called "paper hryvnias" were introduced in commerce. They were ordered by the Central Rada from Germany.

On 5 August 1918, the first bank-note which appeared in commerce was the 3.6% state-bond with the name "Bank-note of the State Treasure". State-bonds were printed with eight coupons, four coupons on each side. Primarily they were to be issued for the purpose of internal loans. But the general lack of circulating banknotes led to state-bonds and even separate coupons being used as paper money.

On 17 October 1918, the Hetman's government received from Germany another supply of bank-notes with values of 2, 10, and 100 hryvnias, as ordered by the Central Rada. A bit later, bank-notes of 1000 and 2000  were received. They were needed by Hetman's Government due to exaggerated inflation in Ukraine. They bore the abbreviation of the Ukrainian State(УД), an official name of Ukraine in the Hetman's time.

These hryvnias were issued on 17 October 1918, 59 days before the Hetman's overthrow.

Bank-notes of the Ukrainian Directorate (14 November 1918 – June 1920) 
The defeat of Germany and Austria-Hungary in World War I resulted also in the break-up of Ukraine's occupation regime (Hetman Skoropadsky's government). On the night of 14 November 1918 in Bila Tserkva, the Government of the Ukrainian Directorate was formed with V. K. Vynnychenko, S. V. Petlyura and others at its head. Within a month, military forces of the Directorate occupied Kyiv. On 16 January 1919, the Government of the Directorate declared war on Soviet Russia. This action required issuing enormous sums of money.

In Kyiv, the Directorate used reserves of bank-notes which were issued previously by the Central Rada's governments.

The military campaign of the Directorate turned out to be unsuccessful, and the offensive of the Red Army forced the Directorate to leave Kyiv and to settle for some time in Vinnytsia (5 February 1919). There the Directorate used 3.6% State bonds for their purchasing power. Under the pressure of Soviet forces, the Directorate retreated still farther to Ternopil, and then Stanislav (now Ivano-Frankivsk) by the end of February 1919. Beginning in March 1919, one of the most unsuccessful series of bank-notes (5 hryvnias) was issued. Compiled from different elements of earlier Ukrainian banknotes, 5-hryvnia bank-notes were hastily printed on grey paper and contained an error in their text: гривна instead of гривень. Some bank-notes with such misprints entered circulation. The next bastion for the embattled Directorate was Kamanets-Podilsk, where it held out for almost a year and issued a few more bank-notes.

First, in August 1919, banknotes were printed with the value of 100, 250, and 1000 karbovanets. For printing of these bank-notes, they used clichés (slugs of type) that had been prepared by the Hetman's government.

One of the best bank-notes among all Ukrainian paper-money is a bank-note of 1000 karbovanets. This bank-note was issued in Kyiv and entered circulation on 13 November 1918. Printing was continued by the Directorate government in October 1919 at Kamyanets'-Podilsk, and in 1920 at Warsaw. The last issue is unknown.

A bit later, lower denomination notes – 10 karbovanets (August 1919) and 25 karbovanets (October 1919) were put into use. The design of the 10 karbovanets (tank-note) was prepared in Hetman's period and their obverse had the large letters УД which designated the Ukrainian state.

The last bank-notes of the Directorate were prepared in Austria. The series contained bank-notes of 50 and 1000 hryvnias. But they were never issued (only some specimen copies are known). On November 20, 1920, the Directorial Government was disbanded by S.V. Petlyura's edict and its provision of currency ended.

Bank-notes of the Ukrainian SSR (1919–1920)
At the beginning of 1919 in Kharkiv, the pro-Soviet government was formed. It represented Soviet Russia in its war against the Ukrainian Directorate. By Lenin's direction Russia financed the pro-Soviet government. However, a period of unprecedented inflation was triggered by the Civil War and resulted in a sharp deficit of circulating money, especially petty bank-notes.

The People's Commissar of Finance of the USSR, with the mutual consent of the RSFSR government, decided to use the 10 karbovanets bank-notes of the Directorate. This note's cliché and artwork (without series and numbers) were captured by the Red Army on 5 February 1919. during the takeover of Kyiv from the Petlyurian troops. The Soviet bank-note differed from the Directorate's in paper, ink, water-marks, and the location of their series and numbers.

One more bank-note of 50 karbovanets with Soviet symbolics was printed. On 1 June 1919, the Ukraine united with the Soviet governments of Russia, Lithuania, Latvia, and Belarus in a common revolutionary front, and only one monetary unit was legitimized – the ruble of the USSR. The necessity of printing separate bank-notes was gone, and the 50-karbovanets bank-note is known only by some specimen copies.

Second karbovanets (1942–1945)
During the Nazi occupation of Ukraine in World War II, the German occupying government (Reichskommissariat Ukraine) issued banknotes denominated in karbovanets (karbowanez in German). The karbovanets replaced the Soviet ruble at par and was in circulation between 1942 and 1945. It was pegged to the Reichsmark at a rate of 10 karbovantsiv = 1 Reichsmark.

Third karbovanets (1992–1996)

In November 1990, with the collapse of the Soviet command economy, the Ukrainian SSR introduced one-time coupons, which were distributed to Ukrainian residents. The coupons were needed in addition to rubles in order to buy groceries and living essentials. On 10 January 1992, the karbovanets replaced rubles at par, with the ISO 4217 code being UAK.

The karbovanets, which suffered from hyperinflation, was replaced by the hryvnia in 1996, at a rate of 100,000 karbovantsiv to 1 hryvnia. The hryvnia was introduced in 1996, a 15-day period was in effect from September, 2nd until September, 16th in 1996, during which both the karbovanets and hryvnia were in circulation. After that, the use of the karbovanets as a national currency was discontinued.

Banknotes

First karbovanets
In 1917, the Central Rada of the Ukrainian People's Republic introduced 100 karbovantsiv notes. These were followed in 1918 by State Treasury notes for 25 and 50 karbovantsiv. That year also saw the issue of postage stamp currency denominated in shah and various bonds, together with state credit notes in denominations of 2, 10, 100, 500, 1,000 and 2,000 hryven. The Directorate issued notes for 100, 250 and 100 karbovanets in 1918, followed by 10 and 25 karbovanets in 1919. State notes for 5, 50 and 1,000 hryven were issued in 1920. 1 karbovanets was worth 2 hryvni or 200 shah.

Second karbovanets
Banknotes were introduced in June 1942 in denominations of 1, 2, 5, 10, 20, 50, 100, 200 and 500 karbovanets. The banknotes were in dark colour, carrying nearly all inscriptions in German, and a warning in both German and Ukrainian stating "falsification of banknotes is punished by imprisoning". The obverse of the notes all featured a portrait, including children, a peasant, a miner, a seaman and a chemist. The Nazi Reichsadler also appeared.

Third karbovanets
In 1991, notes were introduced in denominations of 1, 3, 5, 10, 25, 50, and 100 karbovanets (also called kupons or coupons). All 1991 banknotes were of the same design, picturing Lybid from the monument of the founders of Kyiv on the obverse, and the Sophia Cathedral on reverse. The banknotes did not carry individual serial numbers or signatures. In 1992, banknotes for 100, 200, 500, 1,000 karbovanets were issued, which carried serial numbers and were better protected to counterfeiting.

In 1993, banknotes for 2000 and 5000 karbovanets were issued. Having similar designs as the 1992 banknotes, they were the first to carry the Coat of arms of Ukraine. In the same year, notes for 10,000, 20,000, 50,000, 100,000 karbovanets were also introduced into circulation, which were bigger in size and pictured the Volodymyr Monument on the obverse and the Kyiv Opera on the reverse. Subsequently, banknotes for 200,000 and 500,000 karbovanets were introduced in 1994, followed by the 1,000,000 karbovanets banknote in 1995, which pictured the Taras Shevchenko Monument in Kyiv.

See also

 Ukrainian hryvnia, the national currency of Ukraine since 1996
 Ukrainian shah, historical currency of Ukraine
 Economy of Ukraine

References

External links

 Chernoivanenko, Vitaliy. History of paper money in Ukraine (1917–1920) in Zerkalo Nedeli, September 22–28, 2001. Available in Russian and Ukrainian
 History of Ukrainian money in Zerkalo Nedeli, September 2–8, 2006. Available in Russian and Ukrainian
 History of Hryvnia on National Bank of Ukraine website

Economic history of Ukraine
Modern obsolete currencies
Currencies of Ukraine
Ukrainian words and phrases